International Sava River Basin Commission is an international organisation with its permanent secretariat in Zagreb, Croatia. Sava Commission has been established for purpose of the implementation of the Framework Agreement on the Sava River Basin (FASRB), namely the provision of cooperation of the Parties to the FASRB, for realization of the following goals: establishment of an international regime of navigation on the Sava River, establishment of sustainable water management and undertaking of measures to prevent or limit hazards.

History

After dissolution of the Socialist Federal Republic of Yugoslavia in the early 1990s, the Sava River, which was the biggest national river in Yugoslavia, has become an international river of 4 former Yugoslav republics. Following the support of the Stability Pact for South-Eastern Europe, four riparian countries of the Sava River Basin - Bosnia and Herzegovina, Federal Republic of Yugoslavia>Serbia, Republic of Croatia and Republic of Slovenia entered into a process of cooperation known as "the Sava River Basin Initiative". As result of that, on the November 29, 2001 in Sarajevo was signed "Letter of Intent".After that the basin countries accepted a challenge and managed to conclude the Framework Agreement on the Sava River Basin (FASRB). The result of FASRB agreement, which integrated all aspects of the water resources management was established of International Sava River Basin Commission (ISRBC) for the implementation of the FASRB. FASRB entered into force on December 29, 2004 The First Constitutional Session of the Sava Commission was held on June 27, 2005 The permanent Secretariat of the Sava Commission started to work on January 9, 2006.

See also
Sava
International Commission for the Protection of the Danube River
Danube Commission (1948)

References

External links
Official website 

Sava River Basin
.
Organizations based in Zagreb
2006 establishments in Europe
Environmental organizations established in 2006
Organizations established in 2006